2014 World Series is the 2014 championship series of Major League Baseball.

It may also refer to:

 Baseball and softball

2014 College World Series
2014 Little League Softball World Series
2014 Little League World Series
2014 NCBA Division I World Series
2014 NCBA Division II World Series

 Other

2013 Fast5 Netball World Series
2014 PSA World Series
2014 World Series of Poker
2014 World Series of Poker Asia Pacific
2014 World Series by Renault season
2014 WSA World Series